The following is a list of ports in Pakistan. All ports in Pakistan are maintained and governed by the Ministry of Maritime Affairs, Government of Pakistan.

List of ports

See also
 List of dry ports of Pakistan
 List of fish harbours of Pakistan
 Pakistan National Shipping Corporation

External links 

 Ministry of Maritime Affairs
 Official Site of Pakistan National Shipping Corporation
 Official Site of Port Qasim Authority
 Official Site of Karachi Port Trust
 Official Site of Gawadar Port Authority

 
Pakistan
Foreign trade of Pakistan
Pakistan transport-related lists